Markham Historic District is a national historic district located at Markham, Fauquier County, Virginia.  It encompasses 44 contributing buildings and 4 contributing sites in the rural villages of Farrowsville and Markham.  The majority of resources in the district were constructed in the mid- and late 19th century
and include multiple dwellings, a hotel, as well as commercial buildings, and a train station. The
district also contains early-20th-century dwellings.  Notable buildings include Mountain View (c. 1811), Wolfs Crag (c. 1820), Rosebank (c. 1870), Markham School (1918), the 1819 stone Upper Goose Creek Church, and the former Markham Freight Station (c. 1900).

It was listed on the National Register of Historic Places in 2005.

Gallery

References

Historic districts in Fauquier County, Virginia
National Register of Historic Places in Fauquier County, Virginia
Historic districts on the National Register of Historic Places in Virginia